The women's 100 metres event at the 2000 Asian Athletics Championships was held in Jakarta, Indonesia on 28–30 August.

Medalists

Results

Heats
Wind:Heat 1: +0.3 m/s, Heat 2: +0.3 m/s, Heat 3: -0.7 m/s

Final
Wind: +1.0 m/s

References

2000 Asian Athletics Championships
100 metres at the Asian Athletics Championships
2000 in women's athletics